is a left lateral strike-slip fault which runs along the northeast side of Izu Peninsula south 30 km to Izu City in Japan.  It was responsible for the magnitude 7.0 1930 North Izu earthquake (北伊豆地震).

References

External links 
  (Japanese)
Masato Koyama's Home Page - Shizuoka University (Japanese)

Seismic faults of Japan